The Dawenkou culture was a Chinese Neolithic culture primarily located in the eastern province of Shandong, but also appearing in Anhui, Henan and Jiangsu. The culture existed from 4300 to 2600 BC, and co-existed with the Yangshao culture. Turquoise, jade and ivory artefacts are commonly found at Dawenkou sites. The earliest examples of alligator drums appear at Dawenkou sites. Neolithic signs, perhaps related to subsequent scripts, such as those of the Shang dynasty, have been found on Dawenkou pottery.

Chronology 

Archaeologists commonly divide the culture into three phases: the early phase (4100–3500 BC), the middle phase (3500–3000 BC) and the late phase (3000–2600 BC). Based on the evidence from grave goods, the early phase was highly egalitarian. The phase is typified by the presence of individually designed, long-stemmed cups. Graves built with earthen ledges became increasingly common during the latter parts of the early phase. During the middle phase, grave goods began to emphasize quantity over diversity. During the late phase, wooden coffins began to appear in Dawenkou burials. The culture became increasingly stratified, as some graves contained no grave goods while others contained a large quantity of grave goods.

The type site at Dawenkou, located in Tai'an, Shandong, was excavated in 1959, 1974 and 1978. Only the middle layer at Dawenkou is associated with the Dawenkou culture, as the earliest layer corresponds to the Beixin culture and the latest layer corresponds to the early Shandong variant of the Longshan culture.

Political organization
The term "chiefdom" seems to be appropriate in describe the political organization of the Dawenkou. A dominant kin group likely held sway over Dawenkou village sites, though power was most likely manifested through religious authority rather than coercion. Unlike the Beixin culture from which they descend, the people of the Dawenkou culture were noted for being engaged in violent conflict. Scholars suspect that they may have engaged in raids for land, crops, livestock and prestige goods.

Agriculture and diet
The warm and wet climate of the Dawenkou area was suitable for a variety of crops, though they primarily farmed millet at most sites. Their production of millet was quite successful and storage containers have been found that could have contained up to 2000 kg of millet, once decomposition is accounted for, have been found. For some of the southern Dawenkou sites, rice was a more important crop however, especially during the late Dawenkou period. Analysis done on human remains at Dawenkou sites in southern Shandong revealed that the diet of upper-class Dawenkou individuals consisted mainly of rice, while ordinary individuals ate primarily millet.

The Dawenkou  people successfully domesticated chicken, dogs, pigs and cattle, but no evidence of horse domestication was found. Pig remains are by far most abundant, accounting for about 85% of the total, and are thought to be the most important domesticated animal. Pig remains were also found in Dawenkou burials also highlighting their importance. Seafood was also an important staple of the Dawenkou diet. Fish and various shellfish mounds have been found in the early periods indicating that they were important food sources. Although these piles became less frequent in the later stages, seafood remained an important part of the diet.

Culture 
Dawenkou's inhabitants were one of the earliest practitioners of trepanation in prehistoric China. A skull of a Dawenkou man dating to 3000 BC was found with severe head injuries which appeared to have been remedied by this primitive surgery. Alligator hide drums have also been found in Dawenkou sites.

Interactions with other cultures 

The Dawenkou interacted extensively with the Yangshao culture. "For two and a half millennia of its existence the Dawenkou was, however, in a dynamic interchange with the Yangshao Culture, in which process of interaction it sometimes had the lead role, notably in generating Longshan. Scholars have also noted similarities between the Dawenkou and the Liangzhu culture as well as the related cultures of the Yantze River basin.  According to some scholars, the Dawenkou culture  may have a link with a pre-Austronesian language. Other researchers also note a similarity between Dawenkou inhabitants and modern Austronesian people in cultural practices such as tooth avulsion and architecture. However, the Dawenkou appeared to be genetically distinct from the pre-Austronesian cultures to their south.

Physical characteristics 
The physical similarity of the Jiahu people to the later Dawenkou (2600 BC±4300 BC) indicates that the Dawenkou might have descended from the Jiahu, following a slow migration along the middle and lower reaches of the Huai river and the Hanshui valley. Other scholars have also speculated that the Dawenkou originate in nearby regions to the south. The Dawenkou culture descends from the Beixin culture, but is deeply influenced by the northward expanding Longqiuzhuang culture located between the Yangtze and Huai rivers.

The people of Dawenkou exhibited a primarily Sinodont dental pattern. The Dawenkou were also physically dissimilar to the Neolithic inhabitants of Hemudu, Southern China and Taiwan.
DNA testing revealed that neolithic inhabitants of Shandong were closer to northern East Asians.

Gallery

See also
 List of Neolithic cultures of China
 Longshan culture
 Richard J. Pearson – this Canadian archaeologist has published extensively on Dawenkou burials and social status (see Selected Bibliography of Pearson).
 Three Sovereigns and Five Emperors
 Yangshao culture

References

 Allan, Sarah (ed), The Formation of Chinese Civilization: An Archaeological Perspective, 
 Liu, Li. The Chinese Neolithic: Trajectories to Early States, 
 Underhill, Anne P.  Craft Production and Social Change in Northern China, 

Neolithic cultures of China
History of Shandong
5th-millennium BC establishments